Martin A. Samuels, MD, DSc (hon), FAAN, MACP, FRCP, FANA, is an American physician, neurologist and medical educator. He writes on the relationships between neurology and the rest of medicine, and has linked the nervous system with cardiac function, highlighting the mechanisms and prevention of neurogenic cardiac disease.

Education and training
Born in Cleveland, Ohio on June 24, 1945, Samuels attended Cleveland Heights High School, where he was an honors graduate and president of the 3,300 student body. He delivered the graduation address, elected by his class, and was later elected to the Cleveland Heights High School Hall of Fame.

Samuels credits his own childhood pediatrician in Cleveland, Dr. J.W. Epstein, with providing early inspiration for his future career path in medicine. He was also exposed to medicine, and specifically the brain-heart connection, before medical school through his cousin, Matthew Levy, a cardiovascular physiologist at Mount Sinai Hospital and Case Western Reserve Medical School.

Samuels received his Bachelor of Arts degree in biology from Williams College in Williamstown, Massachusetts in 1967, where, as elected class speaker, he delivered an address titled "Lumberjackets and Dogs." In 1971 he received his Doctor of Medicine degree from the University of Cincinnati College of Medicine, where he was elected to the Pi Kappa Epsilon Honor Society and was selected as class speaker to deliver an Honors Day Address titled "Mark Hopkins on One End and I on the Other." The University of Cincinnati later awarded him an honorary Doctor of Science degree (2005). In 2011, Samuels was asked to deliver the Honors Day Address, titled "Invaders from Mars with Commentary by Robbie Burns," to mark the 40th anniversary of his 1971 graduation address. Samuels also received an honorary Master of Arts degree from Harvard University in 1993.

During medical school, Samuels was influenced by a number of mentors, including Benjamin Felson, Richard Vilter, Edward Gall, Roger Crafts, Evelyn Hess, Gustave Eckstein and Charles Aring, the latter of whom drew him into the field of neurology. He spent a period of time in hepatology and immunology research with the late Dame Professor Sheila Sherlock at the Royal Free Hospital in London. The work resulted in his first scientific publication in Gut showing that a serum factor present in patients with primary biliary cirrhosis was responsible for the autoimmune nature of the disease.

Following medical school, Samuels trained first by completing a full residency in internal medicine at the Boston City Hospital, serving as the medical chief resident in 1974-5, and then as a junior resident in neurology (1973-4), as a fellow in neuropathology (1975–76) and senior resident in neurology (1976–77) at the Massachusetts General Hospital. Samuels is board certified in both Internal Medicine and Neurology.

Clinical career
Samuels is the only neurologist cited in all editions of Castle & Connolly Best Doctors in America. He is able to consult on complex problems, particularly in the interface between general medicine and neurology.

Following his formal training, Samuels created a new neurology service, of which he served as chief until 1988, at the West Roxbury (MA) Veterans Administration Medical Center, a Harvard Medical School-affiliated hospital. There he was instrumental in the merger of two VA hospitals to create the Brockton-West Roxbury VA Medical Center, a model that has since been replicated throughout the VA system.

In 1988, Samuels was recruited to the Brigham and Women's Hospital to create a Department of Neurology from a small division in the department of medicine. In 1994, the department was formally instituted, with Samuels as its founding chair. Since its launch, the relatively new department has grown to include over 250 academic appointments, including 20 full professors, six with endowed chairs, at the Harvard Medical School; one of the largest programs in basic, translational and clinical research with over $40,000,000 in annual research support; 15 divisions; an inpatient neurology service; an epilepsy monitoring unit; a 20-bed neurological-neurosurgical intensive care unit; and ambulatory programs in all major areas of neurological medicine. Basic and clinical research from the department comprises work on Alzheimer's disease, multiple sclerosis, autoimmunity, Parkinson's disease, neuromuscular diseases, epilepsy, stroke, and cancer neurology.

In addition to serving as chairman of the department, Samuels maintains an active clinical practice at the Brigham and Women's Hospital, seeing patients with complex neurological problems. He serves regularly as the attending neurologist for inpatient and consultation services (named the Martin A. Samuels Neurology Consultation Service in 2010) at the Brigham, and regularly provides guidance to neurology residents and students on treating the most complex problems.

In 2018, after serving for 30 years as Founding Chair of Neurology at the Brigham, Samuels stepped down from the Chair to become the Emeritus Founding Chair of Neurology at the Brigham and Distinguished Miriam Sydney Joseph Professor of Neurology at Harvard Medical School.  He continues to be a full-time member of the Department of Neurology where he sees patients and teaches residents and students.

For his clinical accomplishments, Samuels has been honored with Fellowship in the American Academy of Neurology, Fellowship in the American Neurological Association, Fellowship in the Royal College of Physicians (London) and Mastership in the American College of Physicians. He has been the discusser in 13 New England Journal of Medicine Clinical Pathology Conferences—the most ever discussed by a single person.

Major research and publications
Samuels has studied and written extensively on the interface between neurology and the rest of medicine, including neurocardiology, neurohematology, neurohepatology, neuronephrology, neurorheumatology, and the neurological aspects of organ transplantation and acid-base and electrolyte disturbances. His most well-known contributions relate to the mechanisms and prevention of neurogenic cardiac disease.

Samuels has studied "voodoo death", or death caused by fright or intense emotion, which triggers a series of neuro-physiological changes through high levels of catecholamines. He has articulated a unifying hypothesis that explains the mechanisms whereby the nervous system can produce cardiac arrhythmias and myocardial necrosis in a number of clinical contexts including subarachnoid hemorrhage, intracerebral hemorrhage, cerebral infarction, brain tumor, epilepsy and psychological stress. This research, the subject of Samuels' lecture "Voodoo Death Revisited: The Modern Lessons of Neurocardiology", earned Samuels the H. Houston Merritt Award, granted every two years by the American Academy of Neurology for clinically relevant research. Samuels has spoken on his research at the Cleveland Clinic Heart-Brain Summit (2006) and the International Academy of Cardiology's World Congress on Heart Disease, where he delivered the H. Jeremy C. Swan Memorial Lecture in 2010.

Samuels has written and edited several books in the field of neurology. He was neurological editor for Stein's Internal Medicine. He is co-author, with Allan H. Ropper, Joshua P. Klein and Sashank Prasad, of the neurology textbook Adams and Victor's Principles of Neurology, 11th edition; co-author, with Steven K. Feske, of Office Practice of Neurology; and medical section editor of Neurology and Clinical Neuroscience. He has also written for and edited several academic medical journals. He was the founding editor of Journal Watch Neurology, a monthly newsletter of important advances in neurology published by the New England Journal of Medicine'''s publisher, the Massachusetts Medical Society; a member of the editorial boards of The Neurologist and European Neurology; and a regular peer reviewer for Neurology, the New England Journal of Medicine, the Annals of Internal Medicine, Circulation and World Neurology. He is an associate editor of the Annals of Neurology, as of January 1, 2014.

Samuels was one of the first neurologists to become interested in neurologic therapeutics, and was the originator of the Manual of Neurologic Therapeutics, the most widely used reference on neurological treatment. The ninth edition of the manual, named Samuels’s Manual of Neurologic Therapeutics, was published in 2017. He was also the first proponent of the hospitalist system on neurological services; he edited the textbook Hospitalist Neurology,

Samuels has also made several tours in England, delivering lectures on neurology to general practitioners, which provided the basis for his book Shared Care in Neurology, which he co-developed with Dr. Bernard Shevlin, a general practitioner in England, and the American neurologist Dr. Karl Misulis. Samuels has also made several trips to South Africa under the auspices of the Neurological Association of South Africa. He was the 2009 recipient of the L.P. Muller Award from the Erlangen Society for Autonomic Research at the University of Nuremberg, Germany, and was the special lecturer at the Japanese Society of Neurological Therapeutics in 1992.

Teaching
Samuels has served on the faculty of the Harvard Medical School since 1977 where he was promoted to full professor in 1993. In addition to his own courses at Harvard, Samuels teaches other postgraduate courses, in which he speaks on all topics in neurology. He is also the founder and ongoing director of Harvard Medical School postgraduate courses titled “Neurology for the Non-Neurologist” and “Intensive Review of Neurology,” each of which has been presented annually for over thirty years. He was the longstanding director of the Harvard Longwood Neurology Residency and is the co-founder of the Harvard Partners Neurology Residency. Samuels was the first recipient of the Harvard Medical School Faculty Prize for Excellence in Teaching, has been asked to serve as faculty speaker at class day during Harvard Medical School graduation ceremonies a record three times, and was awarded the Partners Neurology Teacher of the Year award in 2004.

In July 2013, a Harvard Medical School endowed chair was established in Dr. Samuels' name. The Martin A. Samuels Professorship in Neurology will be occupied by the future chairs of the Department of Neurology at the Brigham and Women’s Hospital. It is traditional at Harvard to not occupy a chair in one’s own name, so the incumbent is permitted to create a temporary name as long as he is active. Dr. Samuels chose the name Miriam Sydney Joseph Professor of Neurology to honor his parents, Miriam Joseph and Sydney Samuels. As of July 1, 2013 Dr. Samuels became the Miriam Sydney Joseph Professor of Neurology at Harvard Medical School and continues to serve as the Chair of The Department of Neurology and Neurologist-in-Chief, Brigham and Women's Hospital.  When Dr. Samuels steps down from the departmental chairmanship, he will become the Miriam Sydney Joseph Professor of Neurology, Emeritus and the Martin A. Samuels Professorship will be awarded to his successor and passed down to future chairs in perpetuity.

In addition to his teaching role at Harvard, Samuels is a frequent teacher and speaker in venues around the world, and has served as a visiting professor in many medical schools and hospitals. He has been honored several times by his alma mater, the University of Cincinnati College of Medicine, delivering honorary lectures such as the Charles D. Aring lecture and the Distinguished Alumni Lecture; in 2005, he received the school's highest award, the Daniel Drake Medal. In 2007, he served as the Robert B. Aird Visiting Professor of Neurology at the University of California, San Francisco. He delivered the J. Norman Allen Lectureship at the Ohio State University Department of Neurology in 2008 and the Dewey Ziegler Lectureship at the University of Kansas in 2010. In 2012, he served as the Stephens Lecturer and Visiting Professor at the University of Colorado and as the Charles Rammelkamp Visiting Professor at Metropolitan General Hospital - Case Western Reserve School of Medicine in Cleveland, Ohio. In 2013, he served as the Donald Baxter Lecturer and Visiting Professor at the Montreal Neurological Institute of McGill University, as the Seymour Jotkowitz Visiting Professor and Lecturer at the University of Medicine and Dentistry of New Jersey in Newark, and as the William Chambers Visiting Professor and Lecturer at Dartmouth Medical School in Hanover, New Hampshire. In 2014 he served as the Frank and Joan Rothman Visiting Professor at Brown University Alpert Medical School in Providence, Rhode Island and in 2016 and 2017 he served as the Dr. M. Howard Triedman ’52 Visiting Professor and Lecturer in Brain Science. In 2016 he served as Visiting Professor at the Dr. Stanley Robbins Memorial Lectureship at Brigham and Women's Hospital in Boston, as Visiting Professor at the Queen Elizabeth Hospital in Bridgetown, Barbados and as Visiting Professor at Université Pierre et Marie Curie, Salpetrière Hospital, Paris, France.  Samuels served as president Association of University Professors of Neurology (AUPN), the organization of the department chairs of neurology, from 2004-2007.

Samuels has also delivered lectures and continuing medical education courses at medical society meetings and medical conferences. At the national meetings of the American Academy of Neurology, Dr. Samuels created and has on several occasions presented "The Borderlands of Neurology and Internal Medicine," the only one-person, full-day course ever presented; he was asked to convene a similar course at the World Congress of Neurology in 2005 in Sydney, Australia. He delivered a major plenary session lecture on neurocardiology at the 2009 World Federation of Neurological Surgery. In 2006, he received the A.B. Baker Award for Lifetime Achievement in Neurological Education from the American Academy of Neurology, and in 2011, he was awarded the American Neurological Association Distinguished Teacher Award.

He frequently delivers the update in neurology at the annual meeting of the American College of Physicians, a presentation often published in the society journal, The Annals of Internal Medicine, and annually delivers a, one-day ACP course titled "Neurology for the Internist." He has been a major neurological contributor to the national meetings of the emergency physicians (The American College of Emergency Physicians), the family physicians (The American Academy of Family Physicians) and the American College of Rheumatology. He delivered the Keynote Address at the first Pri-Med conference in Houston, Texas cosponsored by Harvard and Baylor Medical Schools, and has participated in many of Pri-Med's national conferences, lecturing on topics including movement disorders, stroke and the neurological examination.

Samuels has also provided education through multimedia outlets, including textbooks, audiotapes and a unique Video Textbook of Neurology for the Practicing Physician, featuring ten 90-minute video presentations spanning the field of clinical neurology. His books, The Manual of Neurological Therapeutics (nine editions), Office Practice of Neurology (two editions), Adams and Victor’s Principles of Neurology, Shared Care in Neurology, and Hospitalist Neurology are standard reading for students, residents and postgraduate physicians. Samuels recorded a seven-part complete neurological examination, which appears in the electronic version of Harrison's Principles of Internal Medicine''.

Personal
Samuels lives in Boston with his wife, Susan F. Pioli, a longtime medical publisher. He has two children, Charles L. Samuels, a mathematician specializing in number theory who is Assistant Professor of Mathematics at Christopher Newport University, and Marilyn L. Sommers, a human resources specialist at Genesis HR Solutions who lives in the Boston area with her husband, Dr. Samuel Sommers, Professor of Psychology at Tufts University, and their two children.

References

21. Samuels MA, Ropper AH, eds. Samuels’s Manual of Neurologic Therapeutics, 9th edition. Philadelphia: Wolters Kluwer; 2017

American neuroscientists
American neurologists
Williams College alumni
Harvard Medical School faculty
Harvard Medical School people
Living people
Brown University faculty
Cleveland Heights High School alumni
1945 births